The Muskegon, Grand Rapids and Indiana Railroad(MGR&I) is a defunct railroad which operated in Western Michigan.  Operating between Grand Rapids and Muskegon, it was the second rail line built into Muskegon.  MGR&I was a branch line of the Grand Rapids and Indiana Railroad.  The railbed now serves as the Musketawa Trail.

References
Musketawa Trail(Muskegon, Grand Rapids and Indiana line)

West Michigan
Transportation in Muskegon County, Michigan
Transportation in Ottawa County, Michigan
Transportation in Kent County, Michigan
Defunct Michigan railroads
Predecessors of the Pennsylvania Railroad
Railway companies established in 1886
Railway companies disestablished in 1917
1886 establishments in Michigan
1917 disestablishments in Michigan